Abantiades magnificus is a moth of the family Hepialidae. It is found in southern New South Wales and eastern Victoria.

The wingspan is about 12 cm.

References

Hepialidae
Moths described in 1898
Moths of Australia